Rupert Miles Sanders (born 16 March 1971) is an English film director. He has directed the movies Snow White and the Huntsman (2012) and Ghost in the Shell (2017). In 2021, he directed the pilot episode of the Apple TV+ science fiction series Foundation.

Early life
Sanders was born in Westminster, London, the eldest son of Thalia (née Garlick) and hospital ophthalmologist Michael Sanders. After a foundation year at Kingston School of Art he graduated with a degree in graphic design from Central St Martins.

Career
Sanders began his commercial production career under Tony Kaye. He had primarily done art direction before Kaye suggested he try out directing. Sanders has directed numerous television advertisements, including The Life for Halo 3: ODST, which won him two Golden Lions at the Cannes Lions International Advertising Festival.

Sanders' first feature film was Snow White and the Huntsman, which was released in the US in early June 2012. The film's budget was $170 million, including an eight-figure marketing expenditure, and it earned $20.3 million on its opening day in the US. To date, the film has grossed $396,592,829 at the box office.

After passing the offer to direct the fifth instalment of the Pirates of the Caribbean film series, Sanders directed a film adaptation of science fiction manga franchise Ghost in the Shell, with Avi Arad and Steven Paul producing and Scarlett Johansson starring in the main role. It was released in late March 2017.

In June 2018, Sanders was announced to direct Johansson again in Rub & Tug, a planned biopic about Dante "Tex" Gill and his girlfriend Cynthia Bruno, with Johansson starring as Gill. However, the film has been left in development hell after Johansson stepped down from starring in the film when the transgender community criticised having a cisgender actress play a trans man.

In April 2022, it was announced that Sanders will direct a reboot of The Crow, with Bill Skarsgård starring as Eric Draven / The Crow.

Personal life
Sanders married model Liberty Ross, sister of Oscar-winning composer Atticus Ross, in 2002. They moved to Los Angeles to further Sanders' career. Together they have two children, daughter Skyla and son Tennyson. In July 2012, Us Weekly published photos of Sanders in an intimate embrace with actress Kristen Stewart, prompting Sanders and Stewart to issue separate public apologies. Ross subsequently filed for divorce from Sanders in January 2013, seeking joint custody, spousal support, and legal fees. The divorce was finalised on 30 May 2014.

Filmography
Film
 Snow White and the Huntsman (2012)
 Ghost in the Shell (2017)
 The Crow (TBA)

Television

Music videos

References

External links

1971 births
English film directors
Living people
English expatriates in the United States
Television commercial directors
People from Westminster
English music video directors